Vamuna virilis is a species of moth of the subfamily Arctiinae first described by Rothschild in 1913. It is found in Taiwan, north-eastern Himalaya and Peninsular Malaysia.

References

Moths described in 1913
Lithosiina